The Abbot of Cluny was the head of the powerful monastery of the Abbey of Cluny in medieval France. The following is a list of occupants of the position.

List of abbots

References
 Catalogus abbatum Cluniacensium

Cluniacs
French abbots